SFGA is an abbreviation that can refer to one of two Six Flags amusement parks:
Six Flags Great Adventure, in Jackson, New Jersey
Six Flags Great America, in Gurnee, Illinois